Frank Taylor (4 May 1855 – 14 August 1936) was an English cricketer who was active from 1873 to 1888. He was born in Rochdale and died in Cheadle, Cheshire. He made his first-class debut in 1873 and appeared in 55 matches as a right-handed batsman who bowled roundarm, playing for Gloucestershire and Lancashire. He scored 1,492 runs with a highest score of 96 and took three wickets with a best performance of one for 4.

References

1855 births
1936 deaths
English cricketers
Lancashire cricketers
Gloucestershire cricketers
Cricketers from Rochdale